Mexico City was the name of an administrative subdivision of the Mexican Federal District that existed from 1941 to 1970.

Mexico City was formed by merging the Central Department (itself formed from the municipalities of Mexico, Tacuba, Tacubaya and Mixcoac) and the delegación of General Anaya. In 1970, Mexico City was split into the four delegaciones of Miguel Hidalgo, Benito Juárez, Cuauhtémoc and Venustiano Carranza.

Former municipalities of the Mexican Federal District